M.K. Mubanga is a member of the Pan-African Parliament representing Zambia.

References

Members of the Pan-African Parliament from Zambia
Living people
Year of birth missing (living people)
Place of birth missing (living people)